Top Country Albums is a chart that ranks the top-performing country music albums in the United States, published by Billboard.  In 1996, seven different albums topped the chart, based on electronic point of sale data provided by SoundScan Inc.

In the issue of Billboard dated January 6, Garth Brooks was at number one with Fresh Horses, the album's fifth week atop the chart.  It remained in the top spot for two further weeks before being displaced by Shania Twain's The Woman in Me, which went on to spend 14 consecutive weeks in the top spot.  Twain's album would later return to number one for a further four weeks in June and July.  Having already topped the chart for 11 weeks in 1995, the album's final total of 29 weeks in the top spot made it the longest-running number one country album to date by a female artist.  The album's time at number one in 1996 was interrupted by two albums: Borderline by Brooks & Dunn and Blue Clear Sky by George Strait.  The latter album won the award for Album of the Year from the Country Music Association.

In July, The Woman in Mes final spell at number one was ended by LeAnn Rimes with her album Blue.  Rimes, who was 13 years old at the time, was heavily promoted as the heir to the legacy of Patsy Cline, one of the most iconic female country singers.  Blue, her debut album, was an immediate success, entering the country chart at number one and the all-genre Billboard 200 listing at number three with one of the highest first-week sales figures in the era of SoundScan sales recording.  The album remained at number one for 16 consecutive weeks, and returned to the top of the chart in December when it occupied the peak position for the final three weeks of the year.  In addition to Twain's 18 weeks at number one and the 19 weeks spent in the top spot by Rimes, Reba McEntire spent a single week atop the chart with What If It's You.  The total of 38 weeks was the greatest amount of time spent at number one in a calendar year by female artists in the chart's 33-year history.

Chart history

References

1996
1996 record charts